The 1986 Volvo Tennis Los Angeles was a men's tennis tournament played on outdoor hard courts at the Los Angeles Tennis Center in Los Angeles, California in the United States that was part of the 1986 Volvo Grand Prix circuit. It was the 60th edition of the Pacific Southwest tournament and was held from September 15 through September 21, 1986. Sixth-seeded John McEnroe won the singles title, his second at the event after 1981, and the corresponding $50,000 first-prize money.

Finals

Singles

 John McEnroe defeated  Stefan Edberg 6–2, 6–3
 It was McEnroe's 1st singles title of the year and the 68th of his career.

Doubles

 Stefan Edberg /  Anders Järryd defeated  Peter Fleming /  John McEnroe 3–6, 7–5, 7–6(9–7)

See also
 1986 Virginia Slims of Los Angeles – women's tournament

References

External links
 ITF tournament edition details

Los Angeles Open (tennis)
Volvo Tennis Los Angeles
Volvo Tennis Los Angeles
Volvo Tennis Los Angeles
Volvo Tennis Los Angeles